Handsome Siblings is a 2020 Chinese television series based on the novel Juedai Shuangjiao by Gu Long. It aired on both CCTV and Netflix.

Cast 
Chen Zheyuan as Xiaoyu'er (Jiang Xiaoyu)
Hu Yitian as Hua Wuque / Jiang Feng
Vicky Liang as Tie Xinlan
Liang Jie as Su Ying
Tay Ping Hui as Yan Nantian
Gallen Lo as Jiang Biehe (Jiang Qin)
Zhou Jun Chao as Jiang Yulang / young Jiang Qin
Mao Lin Lin as Yaoyue 
Meng Li as Lianxing
Zhao Yingzi as Hua Yuenu

Reception 
Handsome Siblings received generally positive reviews, scoring 8.2 on IMDb as of August 2020. Stephen McCarty of the South China Morning Post's Post Magazine noted that despite the story being adapted multiple times, this rendition was a "visual feast" and compared it to "Cirque du Soleil meets Journey to the West". Frankie Stein of Film Daily also gave the series a positive review, praising its multiple story lines, comprehensive plot, and exploration of the themes of loyalty and the meaning of being good or evil. She also noted that the series' distribution on Netflix would introduce a more global audience to an "old Chinese tale".

Broadcasts and streaming

Broadcasts

Streaming

References

External links 
Official Netflix site

2020 Chinese television series debuts
China Central Television original programming
Wuxia television series
Television series about brothers
Mandarin-language Netflix original programming